Lepidochrysops michellae, the Michelle's blue, is a butterfly in the family Lycaenidae. It is found in north-eastern Namibia. The habitat consists of grassy areas in savanna.

Adults are on wing from September to April.

References

Butterflies described in 1983
Lepidochrysops
Endemic fauna of Namibia
Butterflies of Africa